The siege of Arai (新井城の戦い) was among the first steps taken by Hōjō Sōun towards becoming one of the most powerful warlords of Japan's Sengoku period. After attacking Kamakura in 1512, Hōjō turned to Arai castle, on Miura Peninsula, to the south, which was controlled by Miura Yoshiatsu.

Miura Yoshiatsu's son Yoshimoto, believing defeat to be inevitable, killed himself by chopping off his own head.

References

Arai 1516
Arai 1516
1516 in Japan
Conflicts in 1516